In the Czech Republic, each day of the year, except national holidays, corresponds to a personal name. People celebrate their name day ("svátek"—or more formally "jmeniny", but that term isn't usually used) on the date corresponding to their own given name.

In the past, parents were not allowed to choose just any name for a child. This has changed, although it is still common to choose the name from the name day "calendar", and any highly unusual name has to be approved by a special office. The original list was the Roman Catholic calendar of saints, but many changes were made to reflect the present-day usage of names.

The name day is commonly of less importance than birthdays to Czech people. The celebration can be held together with friends or co-workers of the same name and in this way, it can grow in size and "importance".

January
 New Year's Day
 Karina
 Radmila
 Diana
 Dalimil
 Tři králové
 Vilma
 Čestmír
 Vladan
 Břetislav
 Bohdana
 Pravoslav
 Edita
 Radovan
 Alice
 Ctirad
 Drahoslav
 Vladislav
 Doubravka
 Ilona
 Běla
 Slavomír
 Zdeněk
 Milena
 Miloš
 Zora
 Ingrid
 Otýlie
 Zdislava
 Robin
 Marika

February
 Hynek/Jasmína
 Nela, Hromnice
 Blažej
 Jarmila
 Dobromila
 Vanda/Arjuna
 Veronika
 Milada
 Apolena
 Mojmír
 Božena
 Slavěna
 Věnceslav
 Valentýn
 Jiřina
 Ljuba
 Miloslava
 Gizela
 Patrik
 Oldřich
 Lenka
 Petr
 Svatopluk
 Matěj
 Liliana
 Dorota
 Alexandr
 Lumír
 Horymír

March
 Bedřich
 Anežka
 Kamil
 Stela
 Kazimír
 Miroslav
 Tomáš
 Gabriela
 Františka
 Viktorie
 Anděla
 Řehoř
 Růžena
 Rút/Matylda
 Ida
 Elena/Herbert
 Vlastimil
 Eduard
 Josef
 Světlana
 Radek
 Leona
 Ivona
 Gabriel
 Marián
 Emanuel
 Dita
 Soňa
 Taťána
 Arnošt
 Kvido

April
 Hugo
 Erika
 Richard
 Ivana
 Miroslava
 Vendula
 Heřman
 Ema
 Dušan
 Darja
 Izabela
 Julius
 Aleš
 Vincenc
 Anastázie
 Irena
 Rudolf
 Valérie
 Rostislav
 Marcela
 Alexandra
 Evženie
 Vojtěch
 Jiří
 Marek
 Oto
 Jaroslav
 Vlastislav
 Robert
 Blahoslav

May
 Labour Day(May Day)
 Zikmund
 Alexej
 Květoslav
 Klaudie
 Radoslav
 Stanislav
 National holiday
 Ctibor
 Blažena
 Svatava
 Pankrác
 Servác
 Bonifác
 Žofie
 Přemysl
 Aneta
 Nataša
 Ivo a Engelbert
 Zbyšek
 Monika
 Emil
 Vladimír
 Jana
 Viola
 Filip
 Valdemar
 Vilém
 Maxmilián
 Ferdinand
 Kamila

June
 Laura
 Jarmil
 Tamara
 Dalibor
 Dobroslav
 Norbert
 Iveta
 Medard
 Stanislava
 Gita
 Bruno
 Antonie
 Antonín
 Roland
 Vít
 Zbyněk
 Adolf
 Milan
 Leoš
 Květa/Květuše
 Alois
 Pavla
 Zdeňka
 Jan
 Ivan
 Adriana
 Ladislav
 Lubomír
 Petr a Pavel
 Šárka

July
 Jaroslava
 Patricie
 Radomír
 Prokop
 National holiday
 National holiday(Jan Hus, 1415)
 Bohuslava
 Nora
 Drahoslava
 Libuše/Amálie
 Olga
 Bořek
 Markéta
 Karolína
 Jindřich
 Luboš
 Martina
 Drahomíra
 Čeněk
 Ilja
 Vítězslav
 Magdaléna
 Libor
 Kristýna
 Jakub
 Anna
 Věroslav
 Viktor
 Marta
 Bořivoj
 Ignác

August
 Oskar
 Gustav
 Miluše
 Dominik
 Kristián
 Oldřiška
 Lada
 Soběslav
 Roman
 Vavřinec
 Zuzana
 Klára
 Alena
 Alan
 Hana
 Jáchym
 Petra
 Helena
 Ludvík
 Bernard
 Johana
 Bohuslav
 Sandra
 Bartoloměj
 Radim
 Luděk
 Otakar
 Augustýn
 Evelína
 Vladěna
 Pavlína

September
 Linda/Samuel
 Adéla
 Bronislav/Bronislava
 Jindřiška
 Boris
 Boleslav
 Regina/Regína
 Mariana
 Daniela
 Irma
 Denisa
 Marie
 Lubor
 Radka
 Jolana
 Ludmila
 Naděžda
 Kryštof
 Zita
 Oleg
 Matouš
 Darina
 Berta
 Jaromír
 Zlata
 Andrea
 Jonáš
 Václav
 Michal
 Jeroným

October
 Igor
 Olívie/Oliver
 Bohumil
 František
 Eliška
 Hanuš
 Justýna
 Věra
 Štefan/Sára
 Marina
 Andrej
 Marcel
 Renáta
 Agáta
 Tereza
 Havel
 Hedvika
 Lukáš
 Michala
 Vendelín
 Brigita
 Sabina
 Teodor
 Nina
 Beáta
 Erik
 Šarlota/Zoe
 National holiday
 Silvie
 Tadeáš
 Štěpánka

November
 Felix, Kani
 All Souls' Day
 Hubert
 Karel
 Miriam
 Liběna
 Saskie
 Bohumír
 Bohdan
 Evžen
 Martin
 Benedikt
 Tibor
 Sáva
 Leopold
 Otmar
 Mahulena
 Romana
 Alžběta
 Nikola
 Albert
 Cecílie
 Klement
 Emílie
 Kateřina
 Artur
 Xenie
 René
 Zina
 Ondřej

December
 Iva
 Blanka
 Svatoslav
 Barbora
 Jitka
 Mikuláš
 Ambrož
 Květoslava
 Vratislav
 Julie
 Dana
 Simona
 Lucie
 Lýdie
 Radana
 Albína
 Daniel
 Miloslav
 Ester
 Dagmar
 Natálie
 Šimon
 Vlasta
 Adam/Eva, Christmas Eve
 1st Christmas Holiday
 Štěpán (2nd Christmas Holiday)
 Žaneta
 Bohumila
 Judita
 David
 Silvestr

See also
 Name day
 List of saints

External links
 Czech name days
 International name days API

Festivals in the Czech Republic
Czech Republic